The Independents may refer to:

Politics

The Independents (Austria), a defunct political party 1998–1999
The Independents – Republic and Territories group, a French parliamentary group
The Independents (Liechtenstein) (Die Unabhängigen), a political party
The Independents (UK), a defunct group of independent MPs in 2019
Independent politician, not affiliated with any political party

Entertainment and media
The Independents (band), an American horror-punk/ska band
The Independents (film), a 2018 American film by Greg Naughton
The Independents (vocal group), an American R&B group 1971–1975

See also
 The Independent (disambiguation)